Brigadier G. K. B. Nair was an Indian army officer from Military Intelligence, who set up the Indian mission in Afghanistan after the fall of Taliban, and was known by the nickname KGB.  He was an alumnus of Sainik School, Kazhakootam and National Defence Academy.

References

2012 deaths
Indian Army officers
Sainik School alumni